Sixth Sense Kannada is an Indian Kannada-language reality game show created by Ohmkar and hosted by Akul Balaji. It is based on the Telugu-language show Sixth Sense. The show started airing on Star Suvarna from 7 July 2018 to 13 October 2018. A total of 28 episodes were aired.

Paricipants

Adaptations

References

External links 
 Sixth Sense Kannada on Hotstar

Kannada-language television shows
2018 Indian television series debuts
Star Suvarna original programming
2018 Indian television series endings
Indian game shows
Indian reality television series